North of America is a Canadian post hardcore band formed in 1997 in Halifax, Nova Scotia. The music group has recorded with Matlock Records in Canada and the American label Level Plane Records. Members of Halifax's State Champs and Truro's The Motes formed North of America in 1997. They have toured throughout North America and Europe, and members have been involved with other musical projects such as The Plan, The Holy Shroud, INSTRUMENTS, Vkngs, The Got To Get Got, Ov Gramme, production for Buck 65, and composition of original music for the award winning CBC television show Street Cents.

The original line-up of the band consisted of Michael Catano, Mark Mullane, J. LaPointe, and Mark Colavecchia. LaPointe left the band after the recording of This is Dance Floor Numerology in 2001. LaPointe was replaced by Jim MacAlpine as of the 2003 Level Plane release, Brothers, Sisters.

North of America disbanded after releasing Brothers, Sisters. Current members now reside in Halifax and Vancouver. Since the breakup, the band has played a number of reunion shows, most recently in 2010, as well as embarking on a Canadian tour in 2005 with Ted Leo and the Pharmacists.

A collection of rarities and outtakes, 12345678910 was released in 2010 on cassette label Bart Records.

Discography
 12345678910 Cassette, Bart Records, 2010
 Brothers, Sisters LP, Level Plane Records, 04/01/2003
 Elements of an Incomplete Map, Pt. II 2002
 The Sepultura CD, Level Plane Records, 02/01/2002
 This is Dance Floor Numerology CD, Progeria Records, 04/04/2001
 The Sepultura LP, The Kingdom of God, 10/04/2000
 These Songs are Cursed CD/LP, Matlock Records (USA and Canada), Rewika Records (Europe), 04/12/1999
 Bayonet Point 7", Montesano Records, 1999
 Elements of an Incomplete Map CD, Matlock Records, 06/12/1998

Compilation appearances
 Walking in Greatcoats on Four Dots, Montesano Records (1999)
 The Sneaks are Everywhere on Self Portrait Compilation 7" (1999)
 Overcoated on Making the Impossible Possible, Chimaeric (1999)
 We Had To Call Your Parents on In The Film They Made Us A Little More Articulate'', Escape Goat Records, 2003

References

External links
 North of America at Myspace
 North of America at Rewika Records
 North of America at Bandcamp

Musical groups established in 1997
Musical groups disestablished in 2003
Musical groups from Halifax, Nova Scotia
Canadian indie rock groups
1997 establishments in Nova Scotia
2003 disestablishments in Nova Scotia
Level Plane Records artists